Paula Cristina (born 7 July 1975) is a former Portuguese football player, who played for Portugal from 1995 to 2010.

Club career
Paula Cristina won the Campeonato Nacional de Futebol with S.U. 1º de Dezembro twice in 2010–11 and 2011–12, yet failed to qualify for the UEFA Women's Champions League after three attempts.

International career
On 15 June 1995, Paula Cristina played her first international match at the age of 19. On June 19, 2010, she made her 100th national match. Two months later, on the 25th of August 2010, she played her 102nd and last international match.

References

External links
 

1975 births
Living people
Portuguese women's footballers
Portugal women's international footballers
FIFA Century Club
Women's association football midfielders
S.U. 1º Dezembro (women) players
Campeonato Nacional de Futebol Feminino players
Sportspeople from Vila Nova de Gaia